"Baby It's You" is a song written by Burt Bacharach (music), Luther Dixon (credited as Barney Williams), and Mack David (lyrics). It was recorded by the Shirelles and the Beatles, and was a hit for both. The highest-charting version of "Baby It's You" was by the band Smith, who took the song to number five on the US charts in 1969.

The Shirelles' original version
The song was produced by Luther Dixon. When released as a single in 1961, it became a Top 10 smash on the Pop and R&B Charts, reached number three on the R&B chart and peaked at number eight on Billboard's Hot 100 chart. It later appeared on the album Baby It's You, named to capitalize upon the success of the single. The vocal arrangements on this version proved influential in subsequent versions, including that by the Beatles. One notable feature of the song is its minor-to-major key chord changes on the verses.

The Beatles' version

British rock band the Beatles performed "Baby It's You" as part of their stage act from 1961 until 1963, and recorded it on February 11, 1963, for their first album, Please Please Me, along with "Boys", another song by the Shirelles. American label Vee-Jay Records included it on Introducing... The Beatles and Songs, Pictures and Stories of the Fabulous Beatles. Capitol included it on The Early Beatles. The Beatles' version differs from the Shirelles' by repeating the second verse instead of the first.

A live version was released on Live at the BBC in 1994. On this version, Lennon does not repeat part of the second verse after the solo (as he did on the studio version), but repeats part of the first verse, which is the way the Shirelles sang the song. The song was issued as a CD single and a vinyl E.P. in 1995 in both the UK and the US, the Beatles' first in nearly a decade. Both versions have four tracks, as was the norm on CD singles at that point. The three additional tracks, while from BBC recordings, did not appear on Live at the BBC. "I'll Follow the Sun" and "Boys" were later included on On Air – Live at the BBC Volume 2, but this recording of "Devil in Her Heart" remains unique to this release. The single reached number seven in the UK and number 67 on the Billboard Hot 100.

1995 release track listing
"Baby It's You" (Bacharach/David/Williams) – 2:45
"I'll Follow the Sun" (Lennon–McCartney) – 1:51
"Devil in Her Heart" (Drapkin) – 2:23
"Boys" (Dixon/Farrell) – 2:29

Music video
A live music video was released in 1994 to promote the single. It consisted of a combination of the Beatles dancing and still photographs, and was later included on a DVD or Blu-ray that comes with the 2015 release 1+.

Personnel
John Lennon – vocals, rhythm guitar
Paul McCartney – bass, backing vocals
George Harrison – lead guitar, backing vocals
Ringo Starr – drums
George Martin – celesta
Norman Smith – engineer

Charts

Smith version
Smith's version appeared on their debut album, A Group Called Smith. The single was released on Dunhill Records (4206) in 1969. It was their first and most successful release. This version, arranged by Del Shannon who "discovered" the group, alters the traditional vocal arrangement as performed by the Shirelles and the Beatles in favor of a more belted, soulful vocal. The single hit number five on the Billboard Hot 100, and was ranked number 28 in Billboard's year-end chart of 1969. The Smith version was used in Quentin Tarantino's Death Proof.

Charts

References

1961 songs
Songs with lyrics by Mack David
Songs with music by Burt Bacharach
The Shirelles songs
The Beatles songs
1961 singles
1969 singles
1995 singles
Oricon International Singles Chart number-one singles
Song recordings produced by George Martin
Scepter Records singles
Apple Records singles
Songs written by Luther Dixon